Enzo Cosimi is an Italian choreographer.
In 1987 he made his debut in United States with a work with music by the Italian composer Pierluigi Castellano.

Achievements
Cosimi is most known for collaborating with DJ Richie Hawtin to create a piece called "9.20" for the 2006 Winter Olympics Opening Ceremony.

References

Italian choreographers
Living people
Year of birth missing (living people)